Gallows Pond is a  kettlehole pond in Plymouth, Massachusetts. The pond is west of and adjacent to Long Pond, south of Little Long Pond, and northeast of Halfway Pond. Camp Wind-in-the-Pines Girl Scout Center is located along the shore of this pond.

References

External links
Environmental Protection Agency
Six Ponds Improvement Association

Ponds of Plymouth, Massachusetts
Ponds of Massachusetts